Vladimír Caldr (born November 26, 1958) is a Czech former professional ice hockey player.

Caldr played in the Czechoslovak First Ice Hockey League for Motor České Budějovice and ASD Dukla Jihlava. He played for the Czechoslovak national team and won a silver medal at the 1984 Winter Olympics.

Career statistics

Regular season and playoffs

International

References

External links

1958 births
Living people
Czech ice hockey right wingers
Czechoslovak ice hockey right wingers
Ice hockey players at the 1984 Winter Olympics
Medalists at the 1984 Winter Olympics
Olympic ice hockey players of Czechoslovakia
Olympic medalists in ice hockey
Olympic silver medalists for Czechoslovakia
Sportspeople from Písek
HC Dukla Jihlava players
ERC Ingolstadt players
Motor České Budějovice players
Stadion Hradec Králové players
KLH Vajgar Jindřichův Hradec players
HC Tábor players
Czechoslovak expatriate sportspeople in the Netherlands
Czechoslovak expatriate ice hockey people
Czech expatriate ice hockey players in Germany
Expatriate ice hockey players in the Netherlands